Liquid Soul is a jazz, hip-hop, funk, freestyle fusion ensemble formed in 1993 from Chicago, Illinois which helped pioneer the acid jazz movement in the United States in the 90s. Coined "Beyond Acid Jazz" by founder Mars Williams who plays with The Psychedelic Furs and previously with The Waitresses and Billy Idol, and co-founded by guitarist Tommy Klein, from the Spies Who Surf, the band's 2000 album Here's the Deal was nominated for a Grammy in the Best Contemporary Jazz Album category.

History
Their first regular venue was at Chicago's Elbo Room, where their quickly-growing popularity led to the release of their self-titled, debut album Liquid Soul by Ark 21 Records. A well-popularized appearance at Dennis Rodman's birthday party added to their notoriety. They were the main feature at Double Door in Wicker Park for almost four years (Feb. 1996 to Dec. 1999). Subsequent tours took them across the United States and Canada, plus performances in Germany, Turkey and Japan. They have opened for Sting and Isaac Hayes, played at Bill Clinton's second Inaugural Parade and 21st Century Ball, and were the first acid jazz band to play at the Newport Jazz Festival. They also appeared twice at the South By Southwest Music Festival where the Austin American-Statesman referred to them as "the single hottest showcase of the festival." They have recorded four more CDs: Make Some Noise (produced by Ark 21 Records in 1998), Grammy-nominated Here's the Deal (produced by Shanachie Records in 2000), Evolution (produced by Shanachie in 2002) and most recently One-Two Punch (produced by major label Telarc in 2006).

Notable performance venues
 Double Door Liquid Soul 20th Anniversary Show, Chicago, Jan 20 2013
 Niwot Jazz on 2nd Avenue, Niwot, CO Aug 19 2012
 Double Door Liquid Soul 15th Anniversary Show, Chicago, Jan 18 2009
 Sting opening shows (Central Park, New York City; Blockbuster Pavilion, Charlotte, NC; Alltel Pavilion, Raleigh, NC), Sept. 2000
 Chicago Jazz Festival, Sept. 2000
 Jazz Wind 2000 Festival in Furano, Japan, Aug. 2000
 Newport Jazz Festival in Madarao, Japan, Aug. 2000
 Sioux Falls Jazz and Blues Festival, July 2000
 Ravinia Festival with Isaac Hayes, July 2000
 Cancun Jazz Festival, Mexico (May 2000)
 Music Midtown Festival, Atlanta, Ga. (May 2000)
 New Orleans Jazz & Heritage Festival (May 2000)
 Babylon Club, Istanbul, Turkey (January 2000)
 Jacksonville Jazz Festival, Jacksonville, Fla. (November 1999)
 Aspen Jazz Festival, Snowmass Village, Colo. (September 1999)
 Sweet Pea Festival, Bozeman, Mont. (August 1999)
 Kansas City Blues & Jazz Festival, Kansas City, Mo. (July 1999)
 Lodo Music Festival, Denver, Colo. (July 1999)
 Black & White Ball, San Francisco (June 1999)
 Indianapolis Jazz Festival (June 1999)
 Canadian Jazz Festival Tour: Winnipeg, Saskatoon, Vancouver, Victoria, Edmonton, Calgary (June–July 1999)
 Moers Festival, Moers, Germany (May 1997, May 1999 and May 2004)
 Festival International de Jazz de Montreal (July 1998)
 Montreux-Detroit Jazz Festival, Detroit (September 1998)
 The Cubby Bear, Chicago (February 1998)
 U.S. President Bill Clinton's Inaugural Parade and 21st Century Ball, Washington, D.C. (January 1997)
 The Theater at Madison Square Garden, New York City (opened for two Sting concerts, March 1997)
 A Taste of Chicago, Petrillo Music Shell, Grant Park, Chicago (July 4, 1997)
 JVC Jazz Festival, Newport, R.I. (August 1997)
 Dennis Rodman's birthday party, Crobar, Chicago (May 1996)
 Nationwide club and festival touring (fall 1996 to present) with well over 100 performances per year.

Band members

Ricky Showalter – Bass
Brian "MCB" Quarles – MC
Dirty MF – MC
Tommy Klein – Guitar
My Boy Elroy – Beatbox/DJ
Ron Haynes – original Trumpet
John Janowiak – Trombone
Devin Staples - Drums
Mars Williams – Saxophone

Past members include...

Simone – Vocals
Race – MC
Mr. Greenweedz – MC
Dan Leali – Drums
Jonathan Marks – Drums
Bret Zwier – Drums
Hugh Ragin – Trumpet
Doug Corcoran – Trumpet/Keyboards
Andrew Distel - Trumpet
Omega (Vikki Stokes) - Vocals
Andy Baker – Trombone
Tony Taylor – Drums
Tom Sanchez – Guitar
Eddie Mills – DJ
DJ Logic – DJ
Ajax – DJ
Jesse De La Pena – original DJ
Josh Ramos – Bass
Phil Ajjarapu – Bass
Newt Cole – Percussion
Frankie Hill – Keyboards

Discography

 Liquid Soul (1996)
 Make Some Noise (1998)
 Here's the Deal (2000)
 Evolution (2002)
 One-Two Punch (2006)
Lost Soul, Vol 1. (2021)

References

External links
Official website
One-Two Punch Review on TomorrowJazz
One-Two Punch Review on Jazz Police
Youtube Show Me What You Got
Youtube Sure Fire One, No Cents & More
Youtube Stop By Monies
Youtube Salt Peanuts
Youtube Sure Fire One

Jam bands
American funk musical groups
Musical groups from Chicago
Smooth jazz ensembles
American jazz ensembles from Illinois
Acid jazz ensembles
Acid jazz musicians
Jazz musicians from Illinois